Piia is a Finnish and Estonian feminine given name. Bearers include:

Piia Pantsu (born 1971), Finnish equestrian rider
Piia-Noora Kauppi (born 1975), Finnish politician
Piia Suomalainen, (born 1984), Finnish tennis player

See also
Namahana Piia (1787–1829), wife of King Kamehameha I of Hawaii
PIIA or Pakistan Institute of International Affairs

References

Given names
Finnish feminine given names
Estonian feminine given names
Feminine given names
Unisex given names